Mercenaries (also known as Prison Raid)  is a 2014 American action thriller film directed by Christopher Ray. The film stars Brigitte Nielsen, with a supporting cast of Vivica A. Fox, Kristanna Loken, Zoë Bell, and Cynthia Rothrock. In the tradition of The Asylum's film catalog, Mercenaries is a mockbuster of The Expendables 3.

Plot
During a visit to Kazakhstan, the daughter of the U.S. President is captured and held for ransom by Ulrika, a female warlord. The CIA tasks agent Mona Kendall to create a team to rescue the first daughter from Ulrika's base, a former Soviet prison nicknamed "The Citadel". The team Kendall puts together were all serving time in U.S. prisons, but are offered full pardons for taking part in the operation.

With the help of a local girl, the four-woman team gains access to The Citadel, but just as they are about to escape after rescuing the first daughter, one of their number turns against them.

Cast
 Brigitte Nielsen as Ulrika, A Ruthless Female Kazakh Warlord.
 Tim Abell as Grigori Babishkov, Ulrika's Second-In-Command.
 Cynthia Rothrock as CIA Agent Mona Kendall
 Nicole Bilderback as Mei-Lin Fong, Explosives Expert & Pilot
 Kristanna Loken as Kat Morgan, Ex-Marine Corps Scout Sniper
 Zoë Bell as Cassandra Clay, Ex-Delta Force Soldier 
 Vivica A. Fox as Donna "Raven" Ravena, Former CIA Operative
 Tiffany Panhilason as Elise, Daughter of The U.S. President
 Gerald Webb as Bobby
 Alexis Raich as Lexi
 Damion Poitier as Webber
 Morgan Benoit as Stefan
 Bernard Babish as Pavel
 Dmitri S. Boudrine as Luko
 Kevin Fry as Jerrod
 Antonio Cullari as Pigmatelli
 Zedric Harris as Max
 Jenna Stone as Rebekah
 Alicia Vigil as Kristina
 Scott Thomas Reynolds as Agent Reynolds
 Alyma Dorsey as "Tuffy"
 Nick Gracer as "Toad"
 Edward DeRuiter as "Vez"
 Emily Lopato as Prostitute
 Adam Dorsey as Guard
 Nickolai Stoilov as Ozgur
 Bill Voorhees as Kierk
 Eric D'Agostino as John
 Carl Ciarfalio as Driver

Casting
Cynthia Rothrock recalled in an interview that she was originally to have played the Brigitte Nielsen role, but another appointment led her to miss the start of filming. The role she was later offered was to have been originally played by Rebecca DeMornay.

Reviews
Mercenaries received overwhelmingly negative reviews from critics, with its dialogue and production values being criticized the most.

References

External links
 Official site at The Asylum
 

2014 films
2014 action thriller films
2014 independent films
2010s American films
2010s English-language films
2010s spy action films
2010s spy thriller films
American films about revenge
American action thriller films
American independent films
American spy action films
American spy thriller films
The Asylum films
Films about terrorism
Films directed by Christopher Ray
Films set in Kazakhstan
Films shot in Los Angeles
Girls with guns films